Newton Township is an inactive township in Shannon County, in the U.S. state of Missouri.

Newton Township was erected in 1842, and named after Joab Newton, a pioneer citizen.

References

Townships in Missouri
Townships in Shannon County, Missouri